Télépopmusik is a French electronic music trio, composed of Fabrice Dumont (bassist of the pop band Autour de Lucie), Stephan Haeri (also known as "2 square" for his solo projects), and Christophe Hetier (also known as "DJ Antipop").

History 
Télépopmusik was formed by Fabrice Dumont (of Autour de Lucie), Stephan Haeri (2Square, of Planet Zen), and Christophe Hetier (Antipop, of Bel Air) in 1997.

1997: Sonic 75
Télépopmusik, contributed "Sonic 75" to the compilation Source Lab 3 X (1997).

2001-2004: Genetic World
The group's first album was Genetic World, released in 2001, with several singles from the album released subsequently.

Rapper Mau, from Earthling, appeared as a guest vocalist on Genetic World as Soda-Pop (tracks "Genetic World", "Da Hoola" and "Trishika").

"Breathe" from the album Genetic World was nominated for a Grammy Award  in the category Best Dance Recording at the ceremony held in February 2004. The track peaked at #42 in the UK Singles Chart in March 2002. Angela McCluskey, the co-writer and guest vocalist on "Breathe," is from the American band Wild Colonials.

The track "Love Can Damage Your Health" gained popularity in the house music genre as a result of a remix by DJ/Producer Dennis Ferrer and Abicah Soul.

2005: Angel Milk
In 2005, the group released their second studio album, Angel Milk. The album received positive reviews from critics, and spawned the single "Into Everything", whose accompanying music video featured stop-motion animation and footage of a house full of leaves.

Rapper Mau, from Earthling, appeared as a guest vocalist as Mau ("Anyway", "Last Train To Wherever", "Hollywood On My Toothpaste", "Tuesday" and "15 Minutes").

2013: Try Me Anyway / Fever
On 24 June 2013 Télépopmusik released Try Me Anyway / Fever EP, which featured New York based vocalist Betty Black (Sylvia Gordon) and remixes from Dirty Channels, Zombie Disco Squad, Populette, Pit Spector and Pino Rastovitch.

2020: Everybody Breaks The Line
In September 2020, they released Everybody Breaks The Line, fifteen years after the release of their sophomore album. Featured artists include Young & Sick, Jo Wedin, Sylvia Black, and frequent collaborator Angela McCluskey.

Discography

 Sonic 75 (1997)

Albums
 Genetic World (2001)
 Angel Milk (2005)
 Everybody Breaks The Line (2020)

Extended plays
 Ghost Girl (2009)
 Try Me Anyway / Fever (2013)
 Sound (2014)

Remix compilation
 Catalogue Of Telepopmusik (2003)

As producer
 Damita Jo by Janet Jackson (2004) [Télépopmusik produced "Looking for Love," the introduction to this album]

Sampled
 Breathe on My Contacts by Jennifer Lee AKA TOKiMONSTA (2011) [Sampled "Breathe"]
 5am Ant Hat by Krayze Music (2012) [Sampled "Love Can Damage Your Health"]

Other
 The Things We Do by Angela McCluskey (2005) [a regular vocalist for Télépopmusik]

In popular culture

The track "The World Can Be Yours" was used as a background track for the Air France ad campaign in 2009.

The track "Last Train to Wherever" from Angel Milk was featured in the final scene of the 3rd Season première of Nip Tuck.

The track "Don't Look Back" from the album Angel Milk was used in a love scene between characters Helena Peabody & Dylan Moreland in the American series The L Word.

A jazz/torch version of "Yesterday Was a Lie" from Genetic World, covered by Chase Masterson, plays a role in the film of the same name.

In November 2008, IBM used the track "L'Incertitude D'Heisenberg" in a video about the company's history.

In 2009, Peugeot started advertising of its 308 CC model with the track "Ghost girl".

Breathe

"Breathe" was used in the 2005 French movie "The Beat That My Heart Skipped" ("De battre mon cœur s'est arrêté"), directed by Jacques Audiard.

"Breathe" from the album Genetic World was also used by Mitsubishi Motors in America as a background track for promoting their new SUV, the Mitsubishi Outlander, in 2003.

"Breathe" was also used by BMW as a background track in their commercial for their SUV, the BMW X6, in 2009.

"Breathe" was also used in Season 2 Episode 12 of the television series Six Feet Under.

The 2008 album Lost by Cool Calm Pete sampled "Breathe".

In 2011, Breathe was the featured background track used for the promo video of the Hermitage Plaza skyscraper project in Paris.

"Breathe" was also used by Carte Noire, a French coffee brand, and Atesh Salih as the male model.

"Breathe" was used in the 2014 Spanish animation movie "Mortadelo y Filemón contra Jimmy el Cachondo"

'Breathe' was used in 2015 by Montreal  pro  snowboarder Sébastien Toutant while riding/shredding down Montréal's 'Mount Royal', continuing through the downtown streets of the city.

References

External links
 Official site
 TELEPOPMUSIKTM Official YouTube
 telepopmusiktm Official SoundCloud
 telepopmusiktm Official Myspace
 Angela McCluskey

Capitol Records artists
French electronic music groups
French dance music groups
Musical groups established in 1998
Trip hop groups
Downtempo musicians